

Systems neuroscience